Brown County Courthouse may refer to:

 Brown County Courthouse Historic District, Nashville, Indiana
 Brown County Courthouse (Illinois), Mount Sterling, Illinois
 Brown County Courthouse (Kansas), Hiawatha, Kansas
 Brown County Courthouse (Ohio), Georgetown, Ohio
 Brown County Courthouse (South Dakota), Aberdeen, South Dakota
 Brown County Courthouse (Wisconsin), Green Bay, Wisconsin